Arboletes is a town and municipality in the subregion of Urabá in Antioquia Department, Colombia.

The municipality is bounded by the Caribbean Sea to the north, the department of Córdoba to the north and east,  the municipality of San Pedro de Urabá to the south and west, and the municipalities of Turbo and Necoclí. The town is 502 km from the city of Medellin, capital of the department of Antioquia . The municipality covers an area of 710 km².

Arboletes has 8 rural townships (corregimientos): El Carmelo, La Trinidad, Naranjitas, El Guadual, La Candelaria, Buenos Aires, Las Platas and Pajillal.

Place Name
The name "Arboletes" means "land of trees", though this is purely historical. Almost all forests in the area were cleared for a thriving cattle industry, an activity on which the municipality depends. However, there are wilderness areas in the municipality, formed by the rain forests that gave rise to the name of the municipality.

History

Arboletes is now a municipality of the department of Antioquia, born of a land dispute between that department and its neighboring department of Córdoba. 

The town of Arboletes was founded in 1920 by José Torres Vargas y José María Reales, and was a township (corregimiento) of the municipality of Turbo, Antioquia. The municipality of Arboletes was established in August 1958.

Economy
Arboletes is primarily a livestock region, and ranching occupies 90% of the land of the municipality. Cattle, swine, goats, and horses are raised in the area.  Agriculture in the area includes Bananas, Yams, Cassava, Maize, Rice, and Fruit.

Mud Volcano
Arboletes has a mud volcano located in the Santa Fe de la Plata corregimiento.  The mud volcano has had eruptions in 2006 and 2010. The mud density allows people to float and swim on the surface. This place is visited by tourists from around the world and is renowned for its medicinal benefits.

Climate
Arboletes has a tropical savanna climate (Aw) with moderate to little rainfall from December to March and heavy rainfall from April to November.

References

Municipalities of Antioquia Department
Populated places established in 1920